Fyodor Vladimirovich Tuvin (3 July 1973 – 13 May 2013) was a Russian football midfielder.

Tuvin was born and died in Ivanovo, and played for his home club, FC Tekstilshchik Ivanovo, for seven years.  He made his debut in the Russian Premier League in 1999 for FC Shinnik Yaroslavl.  He died suddenly at the age of thirty-nine.

References

External links 
 footbook.ru 
 

1973 births
2013 deaths
Russian footballers
Russian Premier League players
Association football midfielders
FC Shinnik Yaroslavl players
FC Amkar Perm players
FC Khimik-Arsenal players
FC Dynamo Vologda players
FC Tekstilshchik Ivanovo players
Sportspeople from Ivanovo